The 2017 Asian Beach Volleyball Championships were staged from 14 to 17 April 2017 in Songkhla, Thailand. The Asian Beach Volleyball Championships are organized every years and Thailand hosted the event for the third time.

Medal summary

Participating nations

Men

 (3)
 (2)
 (2)
 (2)
 (2)
 (2)
 (2)
 (1)
 (2)
 (3)
 (2)
 (2)
 (1)
 (1)
 (2)
 (3)

Women

 (3)
 (2)
 (2)
 (2)
 (3)
 (2)
 (1)
 (3)
 (1)
 (2)
 (4)
 (1)
 (2)

Men's tournament

Preliminary round

Pool A 

|}

Pool B 

|}

Pool C 

|}

Pool D 

|}

Pool E 

|}

Pool F 

|}

Pool G 

|}

Pool H 

|}

Knockout round

Women's tournament

Preliminary round

Pool A 

|}

Pool B 

|}

Pool C 

|}

Pool D 

|}

Pool E 

|}

Pool F 

|}

Pool G 

|}

Pool H 

|}

Knockout round

References
Men's Results
Women's Results

External links
Official website

2017
Asian Championships
Beach volleyball
2017 Asian Beach Volleyball Championships